Nicholas Blake was a pen name used by British poet Cecil Day-Lewis (1904–1972).

Nicholas Blake may also refer to:

Nicholas Blake (Dominican) (fl. 1698–1702), Irish poet
Nicholas Blake (judge) (born 1949), judge of the High Court of England and Wales
Nicholas Blake (Spooks), a fictional character

See also
 Blake (surname)
 Blake (disambiguation)